George Daniel is an American sports official, a former Commissioner  of the National Lacrosse League. He was appointed to the position effective January 10, 2009, succeeding Jim Jennings. On January 7, 2016, he was succeeded by Nick Sakiewicz.

Career
A native of Easton, Pennsylvania, Daniel previously served as Deputy Commissioner and General Counsel for the NLL from 2000 to 2006 before leaving for one season to become President of the New York Titans.  As the Titans team president, Daniel was responsible for all aspects of the launch of the team's business operations culminating in the franchise's January 20 home opener at Madison Square Garden played in front of 13,127 fans, the fourth-largest crowd for an inaugural home game in the 21-year history of the league. The Titans were also a success on regional television, drawing a higher viewer rating than the NHL's New Jersey Devils and New York Islanders on January 27, a night when all three teams played televised games.

Daniel, who was initially hired by Commissioner Jim Jennings in September 2000, had served as the league’s second-in-command for the past six seasons, taking the lead a variety of key tasks including collective bargaining with the player’s association. He also founded the Black Hills Posse of the International Basketball Association and Scranton Miners of the Atlantic Basketball Association. He is also a former co-owner of the Bellingham Bells baseball franchise.

References

Living people
American sports executives and administrators
National Lacrosse League
Place of birth missing (living people)
Sportspeople from Easton, Pennsylvania
Year of birth missing (living people)